Waddel is a surname. Notable people with the surname include:

James Waddel (1739–1805), Irish American Presbyterian preacher from Virginia
James Waddel Alexander (1804–1859), American Presbyterian minister and theologian
John Newton Waddel, Chancellor of the University of Mississippi from 1865 to 1874
Moses Waddel (1770–1840), American educator and minister in antebellum Georgia and South Carolina

See also
Hope Waddel Training Institute
Waddell House (disambiguation)
Twaddell (disambiguation)
Waddell (disambiguation)
Weddell (disambiguation)